Ziggurat is a first-person shooter dungeon crawl video game developed and published by Milkstone Studios.  The game was released for Linux, Microsoft Windows, and OS X in October 2014 after being available for two months in early access. The game was released for the Xbox One in March 2015, and the PlayStation 4 in April 2015. The game is inspired by Heretic and Hexen: Beyond Heretic. A sequel, titled Ziggurat 2, was released on October 28, 2021.

Gameplay
Ziggurat is a first-person shooter dungeon crawl video game with roguelike elements. Levels and encounters are procedurally generated and include bosses, trap rooms, spells, and treasures. During gameplay, randomly selected weapons and perks can be unlocked through travelling the dungeon and levelling up.

Development and release
Ziggurat was developed by indie video game developer Milkstone Studios. The game was initially released in early access on Steam for Linux, Microsoft Windows, and OS X.  The game left early access with a full release on 23 October 2014. On 20 March 2015, the game was released for the Xbox One through the ID@Xbox program. A PlayStation 4 version was released in North America on 21 April 2015, and Europe on 22 April 2015.

Reception

Ziggurat received generally positive reviews from critics upon release. Aggregate review website Metacritic assigned scores of 76/100 for the PC and Xbox One versions, and 79/100 for the PlayStation 4 version. Some critics likened the game to Raven Software's shooters Heretic and Hexen: Beyond Heretic.

Sequel
Ziggurat 2 was released on October 22, 2020 as a Steam Early Access game and has received a number of updates since, and was released fully on October 28, 2021. The title was released for PlayStation 4 and PlayStation 5 on February 3, 2022, Nintendo Switch on February 7, 2022, and for Xbox One and Xbox Series X/S on February 11, 2022.

References

External links
 Ziggurat at Milkstone Studios

2014 video games
Dungeon crawler video games
First-person shooters
Linux games
MacOS games
Indie video games
PlayStation 4 games
Single-player video games
Video games developed in Spain
Video games using procedural generation
Windows games
Xbox One games